Ovidia Yu  (born 1961) is a writer from Singapore who has published award-winning plays and short stories. She has won several awards, including the Japanese Chamber of Commerce and Industry Singapore Foundation Culture Award (1996), the National Arts Council (NAC) Young Artist Award (1996) and the Singapore Youth Award (1997). She has had more than thirty of her plays produced and is considered one of the most well-known writers in Singapore, according to HarperCollins Publishers.

Early life 
Yu was born in 1961 to a middle-class family in Singapore. Her father was a doctor and her mother was a teacher. She attended Methodist Girls' School, where her mother taught, and developed a love for reading and writing at an early age. She became particularly interested in the characters that she read about and would continue their stories in her own 'sequels' to the books. She was writing her own short stories by the time she was ten years old.

Despite her interest in liberal arts, she was pressured into becoming a doctor by her parents and friends at school. She originally attended the National University of Singapore in pursuit of a medical degree, but soon dropped out to pursue literature instead. Before publishing any books, she had earned a living by writing scripts for corporate training videos and translating manuals for machinery.

Personal life 
Ovidia Yu lives in and sets her plays, books and stories primarily in Singapore, although she deals with many issues especially trying to examine the lives of women and LGBTQ in Singapore. 
Yu also suffers from epilepsy and carries notebooks around with her to counter memory lapses. These notebooks are also used for writing, as she gets many of her ideas for stories and plays by observing people in their everyday lives. When she is not writing, she practices yoga daily and volunteers at the SPCA weekly.

Writing 
Ovidia Yu is known for using humour and unique characters throughout her writing to explore changing roles and identities throughout society, especially for women. She is considered one of Singapore's first feminist writers and continues to write thought-provoking plays and novels.

Yu has mentioned that she enjoys writing about strong female characters. She believes that writing these strong characters as female will communicate her message across cultures and nationalities.

Yu’s historical “Crown Colony” mystery series has been optioned for TV by Poisson Rouge Pictures.

Plays  
Her plays include:

 1987 : Dead on Cue
 1988 : Round and Round the Dining Table
 1988 : Face Values
 1989 : Family Affairs
 1990 : Mistress
 1990 : Cupboards
 1991 : Imagine
 1991 : Ja
 1992 : Three Fat Virgins
 1992 : Wife and Mother
 1993 : Be the Food of Love
 1994 : Six Lonely Oysters
 1995 : Three Fat Virgins Unassembled
 1995 : The Land of a Thousand Dreams
 1995 : Hokkien Mee
 1996 : Playing Mothers
 1996 : Every Day Brings its Miracles
 1997 : Breast Issues
 1999 : Viva Viagra
 1999 : Life Choices
 1999 : Haunted
 2001 : Love Bytes
 2002 : Love Bytes II (Love in a time of recession and newater)
 2007 : Hitting (on) Women
 2011 : Eight Plays

Fiction 
Her works of fiction include:

 1989 : Miss Moorthy Investigates
 1990 : Mistress and Other Creative Takeoffs
 1993 : The Mouse Marathon
 2012 : The Mudskipper
 2013 : Aunty Lee's Delights: A Singaporean Mystery
 2014 : Aunty Lee's Deadly Specials: A Singaporean Mystery
 2016 : Aunty Lee's Chilled Revenge: A Singaporean Mystery
 2017 : Meddling and Murder: An Aunty Lee Mystery
 2017 : The Frangipani Tree Mystery
 2018 : The Betel Nut Tree Mystery
 2019 : The Paper Bark Tree Mystery
 2020 : The Mimosa Tree Mystery
 2021 : The Cannonball Tree Mystery
 2022 : The Mushroom Tree Mystery

Non-fiction 
Her works of non-fiction include:
 1990 : Guiding in Singapore: A Chronology of Guide Events 1917–1990

Awards 
She has received the following awards:
 1984 : First prize, Asiaweek Short Story Competition, for A Dream of China.
 1985 : Second prize, Ministry of Community Development Short Story Competition
 1993 : Scotsman Fringe First Award, Edinburgh Fringe Festival for The Woman in a Tree on a Hill
 1994 : Highly Commended, National Book Council Development of Singapore (NBDCS) Drama
 1996 : Japanese Chamber of Commerce and Industry (JCCI) Singapore Foundation Award for outstanding contribution to the development of arts
 1996 : National Arts Council (NAC) Young Artist Award for Drama and Fiction
 1997 : Singapore Youth Award (Arts and Culture)
 2016 : S.E.A. Write Award for Singapore

References

External links 
 

1961 births
Living people
Singaporean writers
Feminist writers
Alumni of the University of Cambridge
National University of Singapore alumni
International Writing Program alumni
Lesbian writers
Singaporean LGBT writers